Al Rebat & Al Anwar Sporting Club, is an Egyptian sports club based in Port Said, Egypt. The club is currently playing in the Egyptian Third Division.

Football clubs in Port Said